This is a list of notable people who were born in or have been residents of the town of Barrow-in-Furness, Cumbria, England. The demonym of Barrow is Barrovian.

Entertainment

Music
 Aim – musician, DJ and record producer
 Glenn Cornick – ex first bass player in the rock band Jethro Tull
 Thomas Round –  retired singer and actor
 Chris While – award winning songwriter, singer and musician
 Kellie While – singer songwriter 
 The Yage Letters – band based in Barrow
 Stephen Fitzpatrick – lead singer and guitarist of the indie rock band Her's

Arts
 Clifford Last – sculptor. son of Nella Last
George Romney – painter and early member of the famed Romney family, was born in Dalton and raised in Ormsgill
Constance Spry – author and florist
Keith Tyson – artist and Turner Prize winner, was born in Ulverston and educated in Dalton and Barrow

Television
 Steve Dixon – newsreader for Sky News
 Nigel Kneale – film and television scriptwriter
 Dave Myers – biker turned TV chef
 Jeffrey Perry – television actor
 Peter Purves – actor and television presenter who lived and worked in Barrow when he began his acting career
 Karen Taylor – television comedian

Sport

Football
 Wayne Curtis – Barrow AFC striker
 Ben Davies – Liverpool F.C. and Preston North End defender
 Neil Doherty – Watford, Birmingham City, Northampton Town and Kidderminster Harriers winger
 Keith Eddy – Watford, Sheffield United and New York Cosmos player
 Harry Hadley – professional footballer and football manager
 Emlyn Hughes – England defender, England Captain and Liverpool captain
 Doug MacFarlane – Tottenham Hotspur forward
 Billy McAdams – Manchester City and Barrow A.F.C. striker
 Ian McDonald – midfielder for seven English teams between 1971 and 1988
 Frank McPherson – Barrow A.F.C., Manchester United and Watford F.C forward
 Vic Metcalfe – Sunderland A.F.C. centre back
 Jim Parker – Burnley and Bradford Park Avenue defender
 Jack Pelter – Huddersfield Town and Hull City midfielder
 Harry Roberts – England forward
 Gary Stevens – England and Everton defender
 Ron Suart – former English football player and manager (most notably of Chelsea)
 George Thomason - midfielder for Bolton Wanderers 
 Albert Tomkin – former outside left player for Tottenham Hotspur
 David Walders – former defender for Barrow, Burnley and Oldham Athletic
 Jack Walders – former winger for Barrow, Burnley and Oldham Athletic
 Fred Walker – footballer and former manager of Huddersfield Town
 Jason Walker – current York striker; former player for Dundee, Greenock Morton and Morecambe 
 Ron Staniforth – footballer for England, Sheffield Wednesday and Barrow.
 Georgia Stanway - footballer for England and Bayern Munich

Rugby league
 Paul Crarey – former Barrow Raiders and Whitehaven coach
 Ade Gardner – Barrow Raiders and St. Helens winger
 Mat Gardner – rugby league player, who currently plays for the Huddersfield Giants  Matt has now moved to Salford Giants
 Ben Harrison – Warrington Wolves player and Ireland international
 Liam Harrison – Barrow Raiders player and Ireland international
 Willie Horne – Great Britain stand-off and Barrow Raiders rugby football captain
 Phil Jackson – Canadian former professional rugby league footballer
 Jimmy Lewthwaite – rugby league winger for Barrow and Great Britain, inducted in Barrow Hall of fame alongside Willie Horn and Phil Jackson
 Jacques O'Neill - rugby league player for Castleford Tigers, also known for participating in TV series Love Island

Motor Sport
 Adam Roynon – motorcyclist – speedway rider

Cricket
 George Bigg – cricketer
 Stuart Horne – cricketer
 Liam Livingstone – cricketer, England white ball cricket international and captain of Lancashire County Cricket Club
 John Iberson – cricketer
 Mike Burns – cricketer, captain of Somerset County Cricket Club
 Len Wilkinson – cricketer

Other sports
 Caroline Alexander – cross country mountain biker, road cyclist and two time Olympian
 Kenneth A. Bray – sports teacher and member of the Hawaii Sports Hall of Fame
 Liam Conroy – Light-heavyweight boxer

Academia
 William Eccles – physicist and a pioneer in the development of radio communication
 Thomas Fresh – pioneer of environmental health and Liverpool's first public health officer
 Pat Hudson – Professor Emeritus of History at the University of Cardiff

Miscellaneous

 Nikhil Rathi – CEO of FCA
 Chris Blackhurst – editor of The Independent
 Victor Chavez – current (2020) Chief Executive of Thales UK
 Gordon Fallows – Church of England bishop
 Maurice Flitcroft –  amateur golfer and a hoaxer
 William Thomas Forshaw – British Army officer, and recipient of the Victoria Cross
 Nella Last – published wartime diarist
 Derek Pattinson – Secretary General of the General Synod of the Church of England
 Sir Leonard Redshaw – shipbuilder
 Dame Stella Rimington – Director-General (DG) of MI5 from 1992 to 1996
 William Sykes – clergyman
 Emma Walmsley – current (2018) CEO of GlaxoSmithKline

Fictional characters
 Álvaro de Campos – heteronym created by Fernando Pessoa
 Charles Parker – detective in the Lord Peter Wimsey stories by Dorothy L. Sayers

References

 
 
Barrow-in-Furness
Barrow-in-Furness
People from Barrow-in-Furness